A proof banknote is one that is printed to test the printing plates to see if it is suitable or not for putting into full production.

A reason a proof banknote may be rejected is the colour is not suitable for one reason or other reasons. 

Another reason a proof banknote may be rejected is due to the design itself being unsuitable for one reason or other reasons.

See also

Specimen banknote

Banknotes
Numismatic terminology